is a Japanese  science fiction live action series and part of the Patlabor franchise. It was produced by Tohokushinsha and distributed by Shochiku. It consists of a drama series and movie.

Media

Drama series
The drama series is divided into 14 "short story" episodes released to Blu-ray and DVD and exclusively aired on BS Digital and Star Channel airing from 2014 and 2015, with limited advanced theatrical screenings dividing the series into 7 "chapters", each comprising two episodes. The blu-ray and DVD releases also followed the theatrical screening format, with each disc containing two episodes and labelled with the same chapter number as the theatrical release. All blu-rays also had a limited advance release before the regular one at the theatres where they were screening, except for chapter 7 which only had the regular release. Broadacsts on online streaming services follow the theatrical and video release format, dividing the series into 7 chapters instead of the 14 episodes.

Movie
The movie  released in theatres on 1 May 2015. The director's cut version of the movie was released on 10 October 2015 alongside a limited blu-ray release only available at theatres where it was screening, before the regular release alongside the theatrical cut's blu-ray and DVD on 3 November 2015. The director's cut was not released on DVD.

The movie's title is displayed as GRAY GHOST THE NEXT GENERATION -PATLABOR- in the director's cut, which is what Oshii regards to be the movie's "true title". The movie also reuses some themes and ideas from Oshii's cancelled Lupin the Third film, namely the secret behind Haibara's identity, which he had previously wanted to use for Hoba in Patlabor: The Movie. There are no significant changes in the Director's Cut, with the differences mostly being dialogue scenes being longer, and Oshii said that the theatrical cut was a shortened version made based on the director's cut due to producers wanting it to fit within 90 minutes.

Novels
Four novels featuring new original stories set during the series penned by Yamamura and overseen by Oshii were published. A fifth novel based on the movie and written by Oshii and Yamamura together,  was also released. The title of the fifth novel is notable because it is shown to be a direct sequel to Oshii's 1994 novelization of Patlabor 2: The Movie, .

Plot
The story takes place in the Patlabor world's version of 2013 Tokyo, taking place after the TV series and movies. The completion of the Babylon Project led to disuse of Labors, and Japan is in the midst of a recession. Labors falling into disuse mean there is also no place for the patrol labor squads, which have been shrunk to only one division.

Short story episodes
The series follows the new members of SV2 as they solve cases and get into trouble like their predecessors did.

Shuto Kessen
SV2 is in peril of being dismantled by police HQ, and Gotouda's investigations into the "great legacy" his predecessor left behind to prevent this lead him to Yukihito Tsuge. Shortly after his meeting with the man, a terrorist group inspired by Tsuge and composed of his followers uses a stolen experimental stealth gunship with optic camouflage, the AH-88J2 Kai "Gray Ghost", to conduct terrorist attacks on Tokyo, starting with destroying the Rainbow Bridge, re-enacting the events of Tsuge's coup. Seeking a way to stop the attacks, Gotouda seeks out the former captain of SV2 division 1, Shinobu Nagumo, to find out what she knows, while the other members of SV2 chase the terrorist group and public security's Kei Takahata investigates the mysterious pilot of the Gray Ghost, Rei Haibara.

Staff
Chief director - Mamoru Oshii
Directors - Mamoru Oshii, Takanori Tsujimoto, Hiroaki Yuasa, Kiyotaka Taguchi
Script - Mamoru Oshii, Kei Yamamura
Music - Kenji Kawai
Labor design - Katsuya Terada
Visual effects - Omnibus Japan

Cast

Series and Movie
Erina Mano as Akira Izumino 
Seiji Fukushi as Yūma Shiobara 
Rina Ohta as Ekaterina Krachevna Kankaeva (Kasha)
Shigeru Chiba as Shigeo Shiba
Toshio Kakei as Captain Keiji Gotōda 
Yoshinori Horimoto as Isamu Ōtawara 
Shigekazu Tajiri as Hiromichi Yamazaki
Kohei Shiotsuka as Shinji Mikiya
Yoshikatsu Fujiki as Yoshikatsu Buchiyama
Koji Kagawa as Yukihito Tsuge 
Reiko Takashima as Kei Takahata
Hiroki Yasumoto as the narrator

Movie Only
Aki Shibuya as the silhouette of Shinobu Nagumo
Yoshiko Sakakibara as the voice of Shinobu Nagumo
Kanna Mori as Rei Haibara
Bin Konno as superintendent general of the police (cameo appearance)

Production and development
The series, including the movie had a budget of ¥2.2 billion (US$20 million).

Shuto Kessen grossed  ¥193 million (US$1.8 million) in revenue, and the director's cut grossed  ¥14 million (US$131,000). This does not include revenue from the drama series, which was not made public, or blu-ray and DVD sales.

The series reuses some ideas and elements from Oshii's 2011 novel ("Giant-Killers: Metropolitan Police Department Security Department Special Vehicles Section 2") in which a similar new generation of SV2, some of whom have the same names as their TNG counterparts, have to stop a terrorist attack on a soccer match. While the names are identical, the characters themselves are significantly different, some being of different genders, and as such the novel is not directly related to The Next Generation. Characters from Bin Konno's Tokyo-wan Rinkai-shou Azumi-han series also have cameo appearances in this novel, as Oshii was inspired to write it due to how Konno's series first made references to SV2 and had a cameo appearance by Goto from Patlabor. Konno later made a cameo appearance in Shuto Kessen as the superintendent general of the police.

While Oshii was the chief director of the drama series, many individual episodes were directed by Takanori Tsujimoto, Hiroaki Yuasa, Kiyotaka Taguchi, younger directors who regard him as their mentor. Additionally, while Oshii wrote the screenplays for some episodes, the majority were handled by Kei Yamamura. The movie, however, was directed and written by Oshii alone.

References

External links
Official Website
IMDb Listing

2014 films
2015 films
2010s science fiction films
Films directed by Mamoru Oshii
Japanese science fiction films
Patlabor
Films scored by Kenji Kawai
2010s Japanese films